Amphionthe doris is a species of beetle in the family Cerambycidae. It was described by Henry Walter Bates in 1879.

References

Trachyderini
Beetles described in 1879